The Royal Indian Navy (RIN) was the naval force of British India and the Dominion of India. Along with the Presidency armies, later the Indian Army, and from 1932 the Royal Indian Air Force, it was one of the Armed Forces of British India.

From its origins in 1612 as the East India Company's Marine, the Navy underwent various changes, including changes to its name. Over time it was named the Bombay Marine (1686), the Bombay Marine Corps (1829), the Indian Navy (1830), Her Majesty's Indian Navy (1858), the Bombay and Bengal Marine (1863), the Indian Defence Force (1871), Her Majesty's Indian Marine (1877) and the Royal Indian Marine (1892). It was finally named the Royal Indian Navy in 1934. However, it remained a relatively small force until the Second World War, when it was greatly expanded.

After the partition of India into two independent states in 1947, the Navy was split between Pakistan and India.  One-third of the assets and personnel were assigned to Royal Pakistan Navy. Approximately two thirds of the fleet remained with the Union of India, as did all land assets within its territory.   This force, still under the name of "Royal Indian Navy", became the navy of the Dominion of India until the country became a republic on 26 January 1950. It was then renamed the Indian Navy.

History

East India Company

1612–1830, the Bombay Marine

The East India Company was established in 1599, and it began to create a fleet of fighting ships in 1612, soon after Captain Thomas Best defeated the Portuguese at the Battle of Swally. This led the company to build a port and to establish a small navy based at Suvali, in Surat, Gujarat, to protect its trade routes. The Company named the force the 'Honourable East India Company's Marine', and the first fighting ships arrived on 5 September 1612.

This force protected merchant shipping off the Gulf of Cambay and the rivers Tapti and Narmada.  The ships also helped map the coastlines of India, Persia and Arabia. During the 17th century, the small naval fleet consisted of a few English warships and a large number of locally built gunboats of two types, ghurabs and gallivats, crewed by local fishermen. The larger ghurabs were heavy, shallow-draft gunboats of 300 tons (bm) each, and carried six 9 to 12-pounder guns; the smaller gallivats were about 70 tons (bm) each and carried six 2 to 4-pounder guns. In 1635, the East India Company established a shipyard at Surat, where they built four pinnaces and a few larger vessels to supplement their fleet.

In 1686, with most of the English commerce moving to Bombay, the force was renamed the "Bombay Marine". This force fought the Marathas and the Sidis and took part in the Anglo-Burmese Wars. While it recruited Indian sailors extensively, it had no Indian commissioned officers.

Commodore William James was appointed to command the Marine in 1751. On 2 April 1755, commanding the Bombay Marine's ship Protector, he attacked the Maratha fortress of Tulaji Angre at Severndroog between Bombay and Goa. James had instructions only to blockade the stronghold, but he was able to get close enough to bombard and destroy it.

In February 1756, the Marine supported the capture of Gheriah (Vijaydurg Fort) by Robert Clive and Admiral Watson, and was active in skirmishes against the French, helping to consolidate the British position in India. In 1809, a fleet of 12 ships of the Marine bombarded the city of Ras al-Khaimah, a pirate stronghold, in an unsuccessful attempt to quell Arab piracy. A subsequent mission in 1819 with 11 vessels proved successful in blockading the city for four days, after which the tribal chieftain surrendered. 

In 1829, the "Bombay Marine" received the additional name of "Corps", and also received its first steam-powered vessel,  . Steaming from Bombay on 20 March 1830, Hugh Lindsay reached Suez after 21 days under steam (plus coaling stops at Aden, Mocha, and Jeddah), at an average speed of six knots. Between 1830 and 1854 the Indian Navy was responsible for maintaining mail service on the Bombay and Suez leg of the "overland route" (England–Alexandria, Alexandria–Suez overland, and Suez–Bombay).

1830–1858

In 1830, the Bombay Marine was renamed the "Indian Navy". The British capture of Aden in the Aden Expedition increased its commitments, leading to the creation of the "Indus Flotilla". The Navy then took part in the First Opium War of 1840. By 1845, the Indian Navy had completed the conversion from sail to steam.

In 1848, an Indian Navy contingent of 100 ratings and seven officers took part in the Siege of Multan during the Anglo-Sikh War. In 1852, at the outset of the Second Anglo-Burmese War, ships of Her Majesty's Indian Navy joined a Royal Navy force under the command of Admiral Charles Austen to assist General Godwin in the capture of Martaban and Rangoon.

Direct British rule in India
After the end of Company rule in India following the Indian rebellion of 1857, the force came under the command of the British government of India and was formally named "Her Majesty's Indian Navy".

1858–1934
Her Majesty's Indian Navy resumed the name "Bombay Marine" from 1863 to 1877, when it was renamed "Her Majesty's Indian Marine" (HMIM).  The Marine then had two divisions; an Eastern Division at Calcutta and a Western Division at Bombay.

As the HMIM wasn't covered by "Naval Discipline Act, 1866" or the "Merchant Shipping Act, 1854", the Governor General in Council was empowered to by the "Indian Marine Service Act, 1884" to help formulate maritime and naval laws. These laws were first formulated and codified in the "Indian Marine Act, 1887" and followed by an amendment act to the same in the next year. The former adopted the general lines of the Naval Discipline and Indian Navy Acts as far as possible, whilst the latter merely supplied deficiencies in regard to grading and rating.

In recognition of its fighting services, HMIM was given the title of "Royal Indian Marine" in 1892. By this time it consisted of over fifty vessels. In 1905, the service was described as having "Government vessels engaged in troop-ship, surveying, police or revenue duties in the East Indies".

When mines were detected off the coasts of Bombay and Aden, during the First World War, the Royal Indian Marine went into action with a fleet of minesweepers, patrol vessels and troop carriers. Besides patrolling, the Marine ferried troops and carried war stores from India to Mesopotamia (now Iraq), Egypt and East Africa.

The first Indian to be granted a commission was Engineer Sub-Lieutenant D.N. Mukherji, who joined the Royal Indian Marine as an officer on 6 January 1923.

World War II
In 1934, the Royal Indian Marine changed its name, with the enactment of the Indian Navy (Discipline) Act of 1934. The Royal Indian Navy was formally inaugurated on 2 October 1934, at Bombay. Its ships carried the prefix HMIS, for His Majesty's Indian Ship.

At the start of the Second World War, the Royal Indian Navy was small, with only eight warships. The onset of the war led to an expansion in vessels and personnel described by one writer as "phenomenal". By 1943 the strength of the RIN had reached twenty thousand. During the war, the Women's Royal Indian Naval Service was established, for the first time giving women a role in the navy, although they did not serve on board its ships.

During the course of the war, six anti-aircraft sloops and several fleet minesweepers were built in the United Kingdom for the RIN. For the next six months these two ships joined the Clyde Escort Force, operating in the Atlantic and later the Irish Sea Escort Force where they acted as the senior ships of the groups. While engaged on these duties, numerous attacks against U-boats were carried out and attacks by hostile aircraft repelled.

These six ships and the minesweepers all eventually proceeded to India carrying out various duties in the North Atlantic, Mediterranean and Cape stations en route.

 was a part of the Eastern Fleet during World War II, and escorted numerous convoys between 1942–45.

The sloops  and  played a role in Operation Husky, the Allied invasion of Sicily by providing air defence and anti-submarine screening to the invasion fleet.

Furthermore, the Royal Indian Navy participated in convoy escort duties in the Indian Ocean and Mediterranean and was heavily involved in combat operations as part of the Burma Campaign, carrying out raids, shore bombardment, naval invasion support and other activities.

Royal Indian Naval combat losses

The sloop HMIS Pathan was sunk in June 1940 by the Italian Navy Submarine Galvani during the East African Campaign

In the days immediately following the Attack on Pearl Harbor,  was patrolling the Laccadive Islands in search of Japanese ships and submarines. Prabhavati was alongside the lighters and was mistaken for a surfaced Japanese submarine.

 was sunk by a Japanese aircraft during the Burma Campaign on 6 April 1942.

Royal Indian Naval successes

 was ordered in 1939, and built by William Denny and Brothers. She was commissioned in 1941, and with World War II underway, was immediately deployed as a convoy escort. Jumna served as an anti-aircraft escort during the Java Sea campaign in early 1942, and was involved in intensive anti-aircraft action against attacking Japanese twin-engined level bombers and dive bombers, claiming five aircraft downed from 24–28 February 1942.

In June 1942,  was involved in the defence of Sydney Harbour during the attack on Sydney Harbour.

On 11 November 1942, Bengal was escorting the Dutch tanker  to the southwest of Cocos Islands in the Indian Ocean. Two Japanese commerce raiders armed with six-inch guns attacked Ondina.

Ro-110 had attacked convoy JC-36 (Colombo-Calcutta) and torpedoed and damaged the British merchant Asphalion (6,274 GRT).

Mutiny of 1946

In February 1946, Indian sailors launched the Royal Indian Navy Mutiny on board more than fifty ships and in shore establishments, protesting about issues such as the slow rate of demobilization and discrimination in the Navy. The mutiny found widespread support and spread all over India, including elements in the Army and the Air Force. A total of seventy-eight ships, twenty shore establishments and 20,000 sailors were involved in this mutiny.

Transition to Independence and Partition

On 1 March 1947, the designation of "Flag Officer Commanding, Royal Indian Navy" was replaced with that of "Commander-in-Chief, Royal Indian Navy." On 21 July 1947, H.M.S. Choudhry and Bhaskar Sadashiv Soman, both of whom would eventually command the Pakistani and Indian Navies, respectively, became the first Indian RIN officers to attain the acting rank of captain. Following India's independence in 1947 and the ensuing partition, the Royal Indian Navy was divided between the newly independent Dominion of India and the Dominion of Pakistan, and the Armed Forces Reconstitution Committee divided the ships and men of the Royal Indian Navy between India and Pakistan. The division of the ships was on the basis of two-thirds of the fleet to India, one third to Pakistan.

India retained the remainder of the RIN's assets and personnel, and many British officers opted to continue serving in the RIN. As only nine of the Navy's 620 Indian commissioned officers in 1947 had more than 10 years' service, with the majority of them only having served from five to eight years, British officers seconded from the Royal Navy continued to hold senior RIN shore appointments after Independence, though all naval vessels had Indian commanders by the year's end.

Dominion of India

In May 1948, Ajitendu Chakraverti became the first Indian commodore in the post-independence RIN, in the appointment of Chief of Staff Naval HQ. On 21 June 1948, the additional designation of "Chief of the Naval Staff" was added before that of "Commander-in-Chief, Royal Indian Navy." In January 1949, the first batch of 13 Indian officers began their flight training, initiating the process which would lead to the formation of the Indian Naval Air Arm.

On 26 January 1950, when India adopted its current constitution and became a republic, the Royal Indian Navy became the Indian Navy. Its vessels were redesignated as "Indian Naval Ships", and the "HMIS" ship prefix for existing vessels was changed to 'INS'. At 9:00 that morning, the White Ensign of the Royal Navy was struck and replaced with the Indian Naval Ensign, with the Flag of India in its canton, symbolically completing the transition to the new Indian Navy.

Commanding officers

Partition of ships, 1947

See also
 List of ships of the Royal Indian Navy
 List of ships of the Indian Navy
 Royal Indian Navy mutiny
 Indo-Pakistani relations
 History of the Indian Navy
 British Indian Army
 Royal Indian Air Force

Notes

References

Further reading
 Harbans Singh Bhatia, Military History of British India, 1607–1947 (1977)
 Collins, D.J.E. The Royal Indian Navy (1964 online official history

 
Naval history of India
Naval history of Pakistan
Military units and formations established in 1934
Military units and formations disestablished in 1950
1612 establishments in India
1612 establishments in the British Empire
Military history of India during World War II
India–Pakistan military relations